Hoterodes is a genus of moths of the family Crambidae.

Species
Hoterodes albiceps (C. Felder, R. Felder & Rogenhofer, 1875)
Hoterodes ausonia (Cramer, 1777)
Hoterodes violescens (Dognin, 1903)

Former species
Hoterodes regalis Butler, 1882
Hoterodes sericealis Pagenstecher, 1900

References

Spilomelinae
Crambidae genera
Taxa named by Achille Guenée